Kerima can refer to

 Kerima Polotan Tuvera (1925–2011), Filipino writer and journalist
 Kerima (actress) (born 1925), French actress